3 Fools 4 April is the first CD/DVD by actor Viggo Mortensen, released in 2006. The album was recorded at Beyond Baroque Literary Arts Center in Venice, California (like his two live albums Live at Beyond Baroque and Live At Beyond Baroque II) on April 1, 2005.

The album features the reading of Viggo Mortensen, his son Henry Mortensen, and Scott Wannberg. Some of the readings come from poets like the Chilean Nobel prize winner Pablo Neruda, Chuang Tse, or even his ex-wife Exene Cervenka, while some of them are anonymous.

Track listing

CD

DVD

Credits

 Viggo Mortensen – editing
 Henry Mortensen
 Scott Wannberg
 Travis Dickerson – editing, mixing, mastering

References

External links
 Information of the album

Viggo Mortensen albums
2006 live albums
2006 video albums
Live video albums
Spoken word albums by American artists
Live spoken word albums
TDRS Music albums